East Nakhalpara is name of a place at Tejgaon in Dhaka city. Its eastern part is on Nakhalpara. 
Thousands of people live here. People of all spheres live here.

References 

Neighbourhoods in Dhaka